Ted V. Mikels (born Theodore Vincent Mikacevich; April 29, 1929 – October 16, 2016) was an American independent filmmaker primarily of the horror cult film genre. Movies that he both produced and directed include Girl in Gold Boots (1968), The Astro-Zombies (1968), and The Doll Squad (1973).

During the 1960s and 1970s, Mikels also operated his own recording label, Geneni Records, which primarily issued radio spot advertisement records used to promote his various movie projects but also released a number of stand-alone singles by such artists as Vic Lance and Little Leon Payne.

Life and career
Mikels was born in Saint Paul, Minnesota, on April 29, 1929; his father was a Croatian immigrant who worked as a meat cutter, and his mother was an herbalist who emigrated from Romania. When Mikels was in third grade the family moved to Portland, Oregon, where his father took up farming. In Oregon, his father changed their surname from Mikacevich to Mikels.

During his grade school years, he was an amateur photographer who developed his own film in his bathtub. While in 8th grade, he was awarded his first acting role in a film that was to star William Powell, but World War II forced the cancellation of the production. By the age of 15, he was a regular stage performer and developed an interest in film-making when he attempted to shoot his performances. In 2008, he said, "I figured out that you have to move the camera around to get different angles, and then you have to edit the film when you're done."

In the 1950s, Mikels moved to Bend, Oregon, joined the Bend Community Players little theater group, and founded his own film production company. Soon, he began producing both educational documentaries, and short dramatic features.

Additionally, as horseman, archery expert, Indian and stuntman, he contributed to the production of several Hollywood films made in Central Oregon. Notably, during on location filming of The Indian Fighter, he taught studio special effects crews a technique for making flaming arrows appear authentic. Before leaving Oregon in the early 1960s, Mikels wrote and directed his first feature-length film in 1963, entitled Strike Me Deadly.

Throughout the 1960s through 1980s, Mikels lived in Glendale, California out of a house he decorated as a castle. He became as well known for his hard-partying lifestyle as he did for his low budget exploitation films he'd produce and direct. He opened his first studio office with the help of actor John Houseman, and helped on many big budget Hollywood films but directing directly for a major studio constantly eluded him. Increasingly he'd shoot more of his films in the substantially cheaper Las Vegas, Nevada area and eventually moved there in the early 1990s.

In 1993, Mikels began running TVM Studios, a film and video production studio based in Las Vegas. On August 28, 2005, he was presented with a Certificate of Recognition by Nevada Lieutenant Governor Lorraine T. Hunt on the day of screening of his then-latest film, Heart of a Boy, which was the only G-rated film of his career. The certificate was awarded to Mikels for his contributions to the filmmaking industry.

In 2010, Mikels released the third installment in his Astro-Zombies franchise, Astro-Zombies M3: Cloned, followed two years later by Astro-Zombies M4: Invaders from Cyberspace. Both were produced by TVM Global Entertainment in association with Blue Heron International Pictures, and distributed by Alpha New Cinema.

Mikels died on October 16, 2016, at the age of 87 from complications of colon cancer.

DVD releases
In 2007, Alpha Video released 10 of Mikels' films on DVD under the Alpha New Cinema imprint. Six of these titles included 10 Violent Women, The Doll Squad, The Corpse Grinders, The Corpse Grinders II, Girl in Gold Boots and Blood Orgy of the She-Devils, all of which Alpha later released as a six-DVD set titled Ted V. Mikels Signature Collection, which was autographed by Mikels.

Filmography

Further reading

</ref>

Audio/video
 The Wild World of Ted V. Mikels (documentary). Directed by Kevin Sean Michaels. Narrated by John Waters. Alpha Video (2010).

References

External links
Official website

Documentary "The Wild World of Ted V. Mikels" official site
Ted V. Mikels Interview at Love & Pop

1929 births
2016 deaths
People from Saint Paul, Minnesota
People from Glendale, California
Film directors from California
American people of Croatian descent
American people of Romanian descent
Deaths from colorectal cancer
Deaths from cancer in Nevada
Film directors from Minnesota